There are two districts (amphoe) romanized as Bang Sai in the Phra Nakhon Si Ayutthaya Province, Thailand, differed only by the Thai spelling and the geocode
Amphoe Bang Sai (1404) (บางไทร)
Amphoe Bang Sai (1413) (บางซ้าย)

Bang Sai